The California Dreams Tour was the second concert tour by American singer Katy Perry, in support of her third studio album Teenage Dream. The tour played 124 shows beginning February 20, 2011 in Lisbon, Portugal and concluding on January 22, 2012 in Pasay, Philippines. It visited Europe, Oceania, Asia and the Americas. The tour became an international success, with tickets selling out and ranking 16th in Pollstar's "2011 Top 25 Worldwide Tours", earning over $59.5 million from over 1 million tickets sold. At the end of 2011, Billboard ranked it #13 on its annual "Top 25 Tours", earning nearly $48.9 million. It won an award for Favorite Tour Headliner at the 38th People's Choice Awards.

Background

In October 2010, Perry told MTV about the California Dreams Tour: "I guess I'm looking forward to making music videos on this new album..... and I'm really excited about incorporating the look and the idea of some of the songs on tour and making a massive production of it. I'm gonna want a lot of visuals. I want it to be 10 times better than when I was on tour last." Baz Halpin was hired to direct the tour and production on the tour began in November 2010. Perry chose Halpin as the director after seeing his work with Pink and wanted the tour to look like the work of artists Will Cotton and Mark Ryden. The tour was originally designed as a theater-based tour with only one or two small arena performances. However, as Perry's popularity grew, the tour was scaled up and revamped to accommodate larger venues. When the tour was revamped, a larger rolling stage was introduced with more lighting, larger video screens, more costume changes, and 14 trucks to transport the equipment. Tour director Baz Halpin designed the show to be a "jukebox musical."

While promoting the Teenage Dream album, Perry expressed that she wanted her upcoming tour to be very visual. She stated, "I hope that it's going to engage all of your senses: sight, sound, smell, taste, touch". The tour was officially announced in October 2010 by various media outlets including Perry's official website, in conjunction with the release of her third single, "Firework". In 2011, Perry announced her North American leg during a live chat on the social network Facebook. She then responded the tour will be very "super girl power" as vocalists Robyn, Yelle, Marina Diamandis, and Janelle Monáe will open her shows during the various legs. Perry further stated she will actively participate with fans during the tour on various social networks including Facebook and Twitter.

Her friend Jessie J was also confirmed to support Perry during the final leg of her tour during fall but had to pull out under the doctor's orders after an injury during rehearsals for the concert. She was replaced by indietronica artist Ellie Goulding.

Calvin Harris was advertised to be the opening acts for Perry in the England, Scotland, Wales, and Ireland shows. On March 27, 2011, Perry announced via Twitter that Harris was no longer involved with the tour. He cites technical restrictions as the reason for his cancellation. He was replaced by DJ Skeet Skeet.

While Perry was performing at the TSB Bank Arena in Wellington, New Zealand, on May 10, 2011, a 24-year-old female was attacked in a mosh-pit situation. The injuries included were a black eye along with small cuts and bruises. The woman stated she was attacked by another female concert attendee in front of her when she told her to "stop pushing her". Perry announced on her website that over $150,000 was raised for the Tickets-For-Charity fundraiser, in which a portion of proceeds from the tour revenue were donated to charity. The money was divided between three charities: the Children's Health Fund (CHF), Generosity Water, and Humane Society of the United States. EMI donated a signed album by Perry herself for an auction for the Society for the Prevention of Cruelty to Animals Auckland. The auction was for the promotion of the California Dreams Tour, where she had visited in New Zealand. The auction closed on May 31, 2011. In November, Perry announced a free show at Staples Center in Los Angeles, which was recorded for a tour DVD. The recorded live performances were later used for the movie Katy Perry: Part of Me.

Concert synopsis

The show begins with a video screen introduction directed by Cole Walliser which tells the story of a girl named Katy who lives in a colorless world wasting her life cutting meat for a mean old butcher. One night, Perry escapes her dreadful reality by falling asleep and visits a vibrant candy land in search of her pet cat, Kitty Purry, and also for her love interest, the Baker's Boy, played by Nick Zano. Katy appears on stage and starts performing "Teenage Dream" with her dancers, while wearing a white dress with spinning peppermints. "Hummingbird Heartbeat" and "Waking Up in Vegas" are performed next, the latter accompanied by a human slot machine, showgirls and an Elvis Presley impersonator. She leaves the stage briefly for a costume change while a video interlude shows Perry taking a shortcut that leads her into a candy forest where she meets two naughty mimes who join her on stage to perform "Ur So Gay". At the end of the performance, Perry takes a bite of their magical brownie. Perry then makes a wardrobe change on stage, trading her skirt for a feathered tail while she begins to perform "Peacock", an elaborated feathered fan dance number. After that, she is covered by peacock tails held by her dancers, and makes a costume change on stage by removing her peacock tail and wears a colorful vampy torch-singer garb over her blue suit. Perry interacts with the audience and invites a male fan on stage to flirt and kiss, and then goes on to perform a slow version of "I Kissed a Girl" which shorty transforms into a rock version. Perry then exits the stage for a costume change while two female dancers keep dancing on stage until the song ends.

In the next section, a video interlude reveals that the mimes' brownie has transformed Perry into a catwoman, a plan executed by the evil butcher all along. "Circle the Drain" gets performed while Perry battles her dancers who are dressed as butchers before going into "E.T." where laser beams run across the stage while a futuristic lyrics video is projected on the screens. The show continues with "Who Am I Living For?" in which she was captivated by her dancers and strapped with elastic strings while being thrown back and forth and at the end of the performance is left on the ground defeated. She is then saved by her two backup singers who dress her in a sparkling dress and moves into "Pearl", at one moment she is lifted in the air sitting in the backs of two aerialists, while near the end Perry moves into the end of the catwalk on the stage where an area of the stage goes up in the air lifting her up. After a brief video interlude, Perry reappears on stage sitting on a swing to perform "Not Like the Movies". During the performance, Katy is lifted high above the stage as images of cartoons kissing are projected behind her. At the end of the number, Perry and her band move to the catwalk. Perry interacts with the audience, and introduces her band members, and picks her guitar to perform an acoustic version of "The One That Got Away", while in selected UK dates, Perry mashed the song with Adele's "Someone Like You". Then, she goes on to perform an acoustic medley of songs such as Rihanna's "Only Girl (In the World)", Jay Z's "Big Pimpin'", Willow Smith's "Whip My Hair", and Rebecca Black's "Friday" while interacting with the public. A giant pink colored cloud descends to the stage and Perry gets on top of it, she is then elevated above the crowd and performs "Thinking of You". When Perry exits the stage, the band and the dancers perform a medley of songs such as "I Want Candy", "Milkshake", "How Many Licks?", and "Tootsee Roll.

Another video interlude starts playing where Perry finally finds Kitty Purry and is now headed to the Big Bakers City Ball wearing a blue wig to meet her lover, the Baker's Boy. Trying to decide on what to wear, Perry starts performing "Hot n Cold", magically going through seven costume changes bursting immediately into "Last Friday Night (T.G.I.F.)". During this song, photos of fans are displayed on the screens. This is followed by a cover of Whitney Houston's "I Wanna Dance with Somebody", in which Perry and her cat Kitty Purry invite up to 20 fans onto the stage at the end of the number. After a high-energy and sparkly performance of "Firework" the encore begins with the final interlude of the show, which reveals that Perry has been dreaming all along, suddenly the Baker's Boy enters her room dressed in a gingerbread costume to deliver cupcakes she has ordered for breakfast. Perry returns to the stage for a performance of "California Gurls" dressed in a silver bra shaped like Hershey's Kisses, dancing with a line of Gingerbread men, and dousing the crowd with a whip cream bazooka. At the end, Perry and the dancers bow to the audience as the curtain falls down.

Reception

The tour received positive reviews from music critics. Bridget Jones from Stuff NZ gave it an excellent review. She said "There was no doubt her fans were left with a truly sweet taste in their mouths after one of the most extravagant and fun performances Vector Arena has seen in a long time". Bernadette McNulty from The Daily Telegraph gave it four out of five stars, complimenting storyline of the tour itself. She had noted "Her California Dreams tour is less of a pop concert and more of a megawatt jukebox musical." They had said that it features all the glitz and glamour, but said that the music lacks a few and it doesn't leave a trace to remember. Jon Mitchell from MTV reviewed the concert at Uniondale and said that "The show stuck so impressively to its storyline about Perry's travels through Candy Land in pursuit of "the baker's boy" that it could almost be a jukebox Broadway musical in the vein of "Rock of Ages" or "Mamma Mia."

Joseph Brannigan Lynch from Entertainment Weekly reviewed the tour through the night in New Jersey, which featured Robyn. He gave it a positive review, but said: "Say what you will about Katy Perry—sure, she has a weak singing voice and her songs are mostly devoid of substance—but as a courier of frothy delights and eye-catching effulgence, she's become one of today's most-satisfying pop stars." Metro.co.uk gave it a positive review. They had said, "The show had a sweet theme and Katy performed in a front of a candy cane staircase against a backdrop of giant lollipops in a characteristically outlandish outfit of glittery fishnet stockings, a sparkly heart-shaped corset and a bright pink tutu." John Mitchell from MTV News gave the concert a very positive review. He had said "It was colorful, triumphant and the perfect way to end a near-perfect pop show" and also added, "Unlike many of her dance-pop contemporaries (think Lady Gaga or Britney Spears), Perry left most of the dancing to her talented backup troupe, who were introduced individually during solos to popular candy-related songs." Emily Mackay from NME gave it a positive review.

Accolades

Broadcasts and recordings

Perry's performance during Rock in Rio was broadcast live in Brazil on Multishow, Globo.com, and Rede Globo, and aired internationally was streamed live on the video sharing website YouTube. In March 2012 Perry announced via Twitter the release of her autobiographical documentary Katy Perry: Part of Me, which was released on July 5, 2012 with Paramount Pictures and contains clips from various shows. Most of live performances were recorded on November 23, 2011.

Set list
This set list is from the show on June 15, 2011 in Columbia, Maryland. It is not intended to represent all concerts for the tour.

 "Teenage Dream"
 "Hummingbird Heartbeat"
 "Waking Up in Vegas"
 "Ur So Gay"
 "Peacock"
 "I Kissed a Girl"
 "Circle the Drain"
 "E.T."
 "Who Am I Living For?"
 "Pearl"
 "Not Like the Movies"
 "The One That Got Away"
 "Only Girl (In the World)" / "Big Pimpin'" / "Friday" / "Whip My Hair"
 "Thinking of You"
 "Hot n Cold"
 "Last Friday Night (T.G.I.F.)"
 "I Wanna Dance with Somebody (Who Loves Me)" 
 "Firework"
Encore:
 "California Gurls"

Tour dates

Cancelled shows

Personnel

Main

 Show Director — Baz Halpin
 Production & Lighting Design — Baz Halpin & Chris Nyfield
 Production Manager — Jay Schmit
 Programming — Baz Halpin & Bryan Barancik
 Lighting Director — Brad Teagan
 Lighting Crew Chief — John Chiodo
 Lighting Crew — Mat Hamilton, Andy Cimerman, Wayne Kwiat, & Daniel Kirkman
 Video Director — Richy Parkin
 Video Producer — Olivier Goulet
 Video Technical Director — Olivier Goulet
 Video Projectionist — Jason Lowe
 Video Tech — Gordon Davis
 Tour Manager — Fitzroy Hellin
 Stage Manager — Aaron Draude
 Event Manager — Jordan Ford
 General Management — Meghan Brown 
 Riggers — Chuck Melton & John Williamson
 Pyro — Phil Maggs
 Lighting Company — Upstaging Inc.
 Video Company — Chaos Visual Productions
 Set Construction — ShowFX Inc.
 Staging Company — All Access Staging & Productions
 Lasers — Laser Design Productions
 Photography — Baz Halpin & Todd Kaplan
 Fashion Stylist — Meghan Brown
 Dancers — Leah Adler, Lockhart Brownlie, Anthony Burrell, Lexie Contursi, Ashley Ashida Dixon, Brandee Evans, Bryan Gaw, Malik LeNost, Rachael Markarian, Scott Myrick, Cassidy Noblett, Anne Stenberg, & Darine Stenberg

Band
 Lead vocals & guitar — Katy Perry
 Background vocals — Lauren Allison Ball & Tasha Layton
 Musical director & drums — Adam Marcello
 Guitars — Casey Hooper & Patrick Matera
 Keyboards — Max Hart
 Bass — Joshua Moreau

Notes

References

External links

Perry's Official Website

2011 concert tours
2012 concert tours
Katy Perry concert tours